Dustin Dollin (born 27 June 1980) is an Australian professional skateboarder who is one of the original team riders for Baker Skateboards

Early life
Dollin was born in Ballina, New South Wales, Australia, and raised in Katoomba, New South Wales. In a 2006 interview, Dollin stated in relation to his place of origin:

"Growing up is growing up. It doesn't really matter where you are because you don't really know any better when you're a kid. I knew I was poor, but that again just teaches you how to swindle money. Also, where I grew up is one of the most beautiful places in the world. And I would know; I've been everywhere."

In a 2008 interview, Dollin explained that he hates returning to Katoomba because "too many old friends are junkies."

Professional skateboarding
Following Dollin's appearance at the Tampa Am contest, the Stereo skateboard brand agreed to recruit him to its "flow" program. Former professional skateboarder Danny Gonzales recalled thinking at the time: "At 17 the dude was already a wastoid. Later that night when we bar hopped, I kept either seeing or hearing him yelling and screaming for not getting into the bars. I thought, god, this kid’s fuckin’ crazy."

Dollin was asked to ride for the Vans footwear company in 1999 and has identified John Cardiel as his favorite Vans team member. However, in a 2013 interview, Dollin referred to the Vans team as a "family" and declined to nominate a favorite rider.

Sponsors
As of September 2016, Dollin's sponsors are Baker skateboards, Spitfire wheels, Independent Truck Company, Volcom, Vans shoes, Happy Hour Sunglasses, Psockadelic and Shake Junt.

Video game appearances
Dollin is featured in the Tony Hawk video games Tony Hawk's Project 8, Tony Hawk's Proving Ground, and Tony Hawk: Ride.

Personal life
Dollin has been married and divorced twice.

He has a distribution company out of Australia with his friend Ben Mitchell named PD DIST, that helps out Australian and NZ riders. PD Dist carries: Baker Skateboards, Deathwish, Heroin, Vol 4, Happy Hour, Psockadelic  and Shake Junt.

Videography
Volcom — Freedom Wig (1997)
Deluxe — Gnarcotica: Great Lakes Tour (1998)
Baker — Bootleg (1998)
Deluxe — World Wide Distribution (1999)
411VM - Issue 36 (1998)
Baker — Baker2G (2000) 
ON Video - Fall 2000 (2000)
Transworld — Sight Unseen (2001)
Thrasher — King of the Road (2003)
ON Video — Winter 2003 (2003)
Volcom — Chichagof (2004)
Streets: Melbourne (2005)
Vans — Pleased to Meet You (2005)
Shake Junt (2006)
Baker — Baker 3 (2005)
Ruthless (2007)
Volcom — Let's Live (2007)
Baker/Deathwish - "Baker Has A Deathwish" (2008)
Baker/Deathwish — Baker Has a Deathwish Summer Tour (2009)
Shake Junt — Chicken Bone Nowison (2011)
Thrasher — Killing Time (2011)
Volcom — Somewhere on Tour (2011)
Thrasher — Chinese Takeout (2012)
Volcom — Europe Summer Tour (2012)
Baker — Bake & Destroy (2012)
TRAVELOGUE Baker Tour (2015)
Vans — Propeller (2015)
Baker Presents "Certi-Fried Pro Rowan Zorilla" Part (2016)
Volcom — Holy Stokes! (2016)
Baker — Baker 4 (2019)

References

Living people
1980 births
Australian skateboarders
People from Katoomba, New South Wales
Sportsmen from New South Wales